Trupanea pubescens is a species of tephritid or fruit flies in the genus Trupanea of the family Tephritidae.

Distribution
Peru & Bolivia, Argentina.

References

Tephritinae
Insects described in 1873
Diptera of South America